Mr. and Mrs. I. N. Phelps Stokes is an 1897 painting by John Singer Sargent. It is part of the collection of the Metropolitan Museum of Art. 

The portrait depicts the New York architect and philanthropist Isaac Newton Phelps Stokes (1867–1944) and his wife, Edith Minturn Stokes (1867–1937), whom he married in 1895, and had previously posed for Daniel Chester French's Statue of The Republic that was featured at the World's Columbian Exposition. 

The portrait was commissioned as a wedding gift for the couple and originally planned to feature Edith alone in evening wear. It was then changed to Edith in day wear posing next to a Great Dane. The dog became unavailable, and Isaac stood in its place.

References

1897 paintings
19th-century portraits
Group portraits by American artists
Paintings by John Singer Sargent
Paintings in the collection of the Metropolitan Museum of Art
Portraits of men
Portraits of women